Stilpnochlora couloniana, the giant katydid, is a species of phaneropterine katydid in the family Tettigoniidae.
They are sometimes kept as pets.

References

Further reading

External links

 

Phaneropterinae
Insects described in 1861